Bear Lake is a scenic trailhead and destination in Rocky Mountain National Park. Several trails, from easy strolls to strenuous hikes, start from the lake. The Bear Lake Road is open year-round, though it may temporarily close due to adverse weather conditions. An ample parking lot is provided close to the lake.

The lake was formed during the ice age by a glacier. Several moraines can be found downhill of Bear Lake.

See also
Alpine Visitor Center

References

External links

Scenic drives in Rocky Mountain National Park

Lakes of Rocky Mountain National Park
Protected areas of Larimer County, Colorado
Lakes of Larimer County, Colorado